Samuel Degarrick Williams (born March 31, 1999) is an American football defensive end for the Dallas Cowboys of the National Football League (NFL). He played college football at Northeast Mississippi Community College before transferring to Ole Miss.

High school career
Williams attended Robert E. Lee High School in Montgomery, Alabama.

College career
Williams played at Northeast Mississippi Community College before transferring to the University of Mississippi (Ole Miss). During his first year at Ole Miss in 2019, he played in 12 games and had 38 tackles, six sacks and one interception. In 2020, he started six of 10 games, recording 39 tackles and four sacks. Williams returned to Ole Miss in 2021 and broke the team's single season-sack record.

Professional career

Williams was selected by the Dallas Cowboys with the 56th overall pick in the second round of the 2022 NFL Draft.

References

External links
 Dallas Cowboys bio
Northeast Mississippi Tigers bio
Ole Miss Rebels bio

Living people
Players of American football from Montgomery, Alabama
American football defensive ends
American football linebackers
Ole Miss Rebels football players
Northeast Mississippi Tigers football players
1999 births
Dallas Cowboys players